The A. C. Eringen Medal or Eringen Medal  is an award given annually by the Society of Engineering Science (SES) to an individual "in recognition of sustained outstanding achievements in Engineering Science".  This award was established in 1976.  The actual award consists of a medal and an honorarium.

Eringen Medal recipients
 1976 –  Lofti Zadeh
 1977 –	A. Cemal Eringen, Samuel C. C. Ting
 1978 –	Raymond Flory
 1979 –	Ian Sneddon
 1980 –	Edward Teller
 1981 –	Joseph B. Keller
 1982 –	Harold Grad
 1983 –	R. Byron Bird
 1984 –	Kenneth G. Wilson
 1985 –	Bernard Budiansky
 1986 –	Paul M. Naghdi
 1988 –	George Herrmann
 1989 –	J. Tinsley Oden
 1991 –	James K. Knowles
 1992 –	Ray W. Clough
 1993 –	Fazıl Erdoğan
 1994 –	Charles F. Curtiss
 1995 –	Satya N. Atluri
 1996 –	Sivaramakrishna Chandrasekhar
 1998 –	Pierre-Gilles de Gennes
 1999 –	Michael F. Ashby
 2000 –	E. Kroner
 2003 –	Gerard Maugin
 2004 –	K. R. Rajagopal
 2005 –	Cornelius O. Horgan
 2008 –	Subra Suresh
 2010 –	Robert O. Ritchie
 2011 –	Ares J. Rosakis
 2012 –	David M. Barnett
 2013 –  Guruswami Ravichandran
 2014 –  John A. Rogers
 2016 –  Gang Chen
 2017 –  Xiang Zhang
 2019 –  Evelyn Hu
 2020 –  Thomas J.R. Hughes

See also

 List of engineering awards
 List of mechanical engineering awards
 Mechanician

References

External links 
 Society of Engineering Science

Mechanical engineering awards
Awards established in 1976
American science and technology awards
Engineering awards